"Bridges and Walls" is a song written by Roger Murrah and Randy VanWarmer, and recorded by American country music group The Oak Ridge Boys.  It was released in December 1988 as the second single from the album Monongahela.  The song reached #10 on the Billboard Hot Country Singles & Tracks chart.

Chart performance

References

1989 singles
The Oak Ridge Boys songs
Songs written by Roger Murrah
Songs written by Randy VanWarmer
Song recordings produced by Jimmy Bowen
MCA Records singles
1988 songs